Hansjörg Bosshard (born 1 February 1940) is a Swiss sprinter. He competed in the men's 4 × 400 metres relay at the 1964 Summer Olympics.

References

1940 births
Living people
Athletes (track and field) at the 1964 Summer Olympics
Swiss male sprinters
Olympic athletes of Switzerland
Place of birth missing (living people)